Pterolophia kusamai is a species of beetle in the family Cerambycidae. It was described by Hasegawa and Hiroshi Makihara in 1999.

References

kusamai
Beetles described in 1999